Therrya is a genus of fungi within the Rhytismataceae family. 

The genus was circumscribed by Pier Andrea Saccardo in Michelia vol.2 (8) on page 604 in 1882.

The genus name of Therrya is in honour of Jean Joseph Therry (1833–1888), who was a French merchant and banker. He was also a self-taught botanist (in Mycology and Lichenology).

Species
The genus contains seven species.
As accepted by Species Fungorum;
 Therrya abieticola 
 Therrya eucalypti 
 Therrya fuckelii 
 Therrya piceae 
 Therrya pini 
 Therrya pseudotsugae 
 Therrya tsugae 

Former species;
 Therrya cembrae  = Coccomyces cembrae, Rhytismataceae
 Therrya gallica  = Therrya pini
 Therrya pini var. mughicola  = Therrya pini

References

External links
Therrya at Index Fungorum

Leotiomycetes
Taxa named by Pier Andrea Saccardo